Sander MacKilljan is a Dutch mixed martial artist. He competed in the Heavyweight division.

Mixed martial arts record

|-
| Loss
| align=center| 8-7 (1)
| Ibragim Magomedov
| Submission
| 2H2H: 2 Hot 2 Handle
| 
| align=center| 1
| align=center| 1:31
| Amsterdam, Netherlands
| 
|-
| Win
| align=center| 8-6 (1)
| Andre Tete
| DQ (headbutt)
| It's Showtime: As Usual
| 
| align=center| 1
| align=center| 1:01
| Haarlem, Netherlands
| 
|-
| Loss
| align=center| 7-6 (1)
| Dave Vader
| Submission (keylock)
| Rings Holland: Saved by the Bell
| 
| align=center| 2
| align=center| 4:02
| Amsterdam, North Holland, Netherlands
| 
|-
| Win
| align=center| 7-5 (1)
| Dave van der Veen
| TKO (3 knock downs)
| 2H2H 4: Simply the Best 4
| 
| align=center| 0
| align=center| N/A
| Rotterdam, Netherlands
| 
|-
| Loss
| align=center| 6-5 (1)
| Ricardo Fyeet
| DQ (refused to break)
| It's Showtime: Original
| 
| align=center| 1
| align=center| 0:56
| Haarlem, North Holland, Netherlands
| 
|-
| Loss
| align=center| 6-4 (1)
| Herman van Tol
| Submission (keylock)
| Rings Holland: Heroes Live Forever
| 
| align=center| 1
| align=center| 2:08
| Utrecht, Netherlands
| 
|-
| Win
| align=center| 6-3 (1)
| Michael Krom
| Submission (toe hold)
| It's Showtime: Christmas Edition
| 
| align=center| 1
| align=center| 1:02
| Haarlem, North Holland, Netherlands
| 
|-
| Win
| align=center| 5-3 (1)
| Renaldo Rijkhoff
| KO (punch)
| Rings Holland: Di Capo Di Tutti Capi
| 
| align=center| 1
| align=center| 1:50
| Utrecht, Netherlands
| 
|-
| Win
| align=center| 4-3 (1)
| Lee Macguinness
| TKO (punches)
| Rings Holland: There Can Only Be One Champion
| 
| align=center| 1
| align=center| 2:11
| Utrecht, Netherlands
| 
|-
| Loss
| align=center| 3-3 (1)
| Barrington Patterson
| KO (punch)
| It's Showtime: It's Showtime
| 
| align=center| 1
| align=center| 2:51
| Haarlem, North Holland, Netherlands
| 
|-
| Loss
| align=center| 3-2 (1)
| Big Mo T
| KO (punch)
| Rings Holland: The Kings of the Magic Ring
| 
| align=center| 1
| align=center| 1:39
| Utrecht, Netherlands
| 
|-
| Win
| align=center| 3-1 (1)
| Rick Holshuizen
| KO
| Rings Holland: The Thialf Explosion
| 
| align=center| 0
| align=center| 0:00
| Heerenveen, Netherlands
| 
|-
| Loss
| align=center| 2-1 (1)
| Hiromitsu Kanehara
| Decision
| Rings: Fourth Fighting Integration
| 
| align=center| 1
| align=center| 3:26
| Tokyo, Japan
| 
|-
| Win
| align=center| 2-0 (1)
| Pedro Palm
| KO (knee)
| Rings Holland: The King of Rings
| 
| align=center| 1
| align=center| 2:13
| Amsterdam, North Holland, Netherlands
| 
|-
| NC
| align=center| 1-0 (1)
| Herman van Tol
| No Contest
| FFH: Free Fight Gala
| 
| align=center| 0
| align=center| 0:00
| Beverwijk, North Holland, Netherlands
| 
|-
| Win
| align=center| 1-0
| Erwin van de Eijnden
| Submission (rear naked choke)
| Rings Holland: Utrecht at War
| 
| align=center| 1
| align=center| 1:46
| Utrecht, Netherlands
|

See also
List of male mixed martial artists

References

Dutch male mixed martial artists
Heavyweight mixed martial artists
Living people
Place of birth missing (living people)
Year of birth missing (living people)